Greatest Hits is a compilation album by Tom Petty and the Heartbreakers, released in 1993. It is Petty's best-selling album to date and was certified 12× Platinum by the RIAA on April 28, 2015. The single "Mary Jane's Last Dance" became one of Petty's most popular songs, reaching No. 14 on the Billboard Hot 100 and No. 1 on the Billboard Mainstream Rock Tracks chart. The other new song on the album is a cover of the Thunderclap Newman hit "Something in the Air". The album contains no songs from 1987's Let Me Up (I've Had Enough). However, three songs from Petty's 1989 solo album Full Moon Fever were included.

On its original release in November 1993, the album debuted at No. 8 on Billboard 200,  and first peaked at No. 5 on the chart in February 1994. It reached a new peak of No. 2 following Petty's death in 2017.

The new tracks "Mary Jane's Last Dance" and "Something in the Air" were the band's last recordings with drummer Stan Lynch.

Reissues 
In 2008, Greatest Hits was reissued by Geffen Records. This edition replaced "Something In The Air" with "Stop Draggin' My Heart Around", Petty's duet with Stevie Nicks from her 1981 album Bella Donna. The album's photos and artwork replaced the Wildflowers and Into the Great Wide Open session photos with outtakes from You're Gonna Get It!. In 2010 the album was once again reissued, this time reverting to the original 1993 track listing but keeping the artwork from the 2008 edition. In 2016 the album was made available on vinyl for the first time since 1993.

Track listing

Personnel
Tom Petty & The Heartbreakers

Tom Petty – vocals, guitar, piano, harmonica, percussion (all tracks)
Mike Campbell – guitar, bass guitar, keyboards, squeeze box (all tracks)
Benmont Tench – keyboards, piano, backing vocals (tracks 1-11, 15-18)
Ron Blair – bass guitar (tracks 1-8)
Howie Epstein – bass guitar, backing vocals (tracks 10-12, 15-18)
Stan Lynch – drums, percussion, backing vocals (tracks 1-11, 15-18)

Additional musicians

George Harrison – acoustic guitar, backing vocals (track 12)
Jeff Lynne – bass guitar, guitar, guitar synthesizer, piano, keyboards, backing vocals (tracks 12–16)
David A. Stewart – sitar, keyboards, backing vocals (track 11)

Uncredited musicians

Donald "Duck" Dunn – bass guitar (track 18, 2008 release)
Dean Garcia – intro bass guitar (track 11)
Phil Jones – percussion, drums (tracks 9-10, 12–14)
Jeff Jourard – guitar (track 2)
Jim Keltner – percussion (track 5)
Stevie Nicks – co-lead vocals (track 18, 2008 release)
Lori Perry, Sharon Celani - backing vocals (track 18, 2008 release)
Daniel Rothmuller – cello (track 11)
Phil Seymour – backing vocals (tracks 1–2)
Chris Trujillo – percussion (tracks 17–18)
Alan "Bugs" Weidel – "wild dog" piano (track 11)
Sharon Celani, Marilyn Martin, Stephanie Sprull – backing vocals (track 11)

Charts

Weekly charts

Year-end charts

Certifications

Release history

See also
List of best-selling albums in the United States

References

Tom Petty compilation albums
1993 greatest hits albums
Albums produced by Denny Cordell
Albums produced by Rick Rubin
Albums produced by Jimmy Iovine
Albums produced by Jeff Lynne
Albums produced by Tom Petty
Geffen Records compilation albums
MCA Records compilation albums
Universal Music Enterprises compilation albums